The Europe Zone was one of the two regional zones of the 1924 International Lawn Tennis Challenge.

17 teams entered the Europe Zone, with the winner going on to compete in the Inter-Zonal Final against the winner of the America Zone. France defeated the Czechoslovakia in the final, and went on to face Australia in the Inter-Zonal Final.

Draw

First round

Great Britain vs. Belgium

Second round

Great Britain vs. Spain

Netherlands vs. India

Ireland vs. France

Denmark vs. Hungary

Czechoslovakia vs. New Zealand

Austria vs. Switzerland

Quarterfinals

Great Britain vs. South Africa

France vs. India

Denmark vs. Italy

Czechoslovakia vs. Switzerland

Semifinals

Great Britain vs. France

Denmark vs. Czechoslovakia

Final

France vs. Czechoslovakia

References

External links
Davis Cup official website

Davis Cup Europe/Africa Zone
Europe Zone
International Lawn Tennis Challenge